The Allies carried out an aerial bombing campaign against the Axis in Belgrade during the Allied bombing of Yugoslavia in World War II. The air strikes lasted from 16 April 1944 to 6 September 1944.

Belgrade was bombed eleven times by the Anglo–American air force. Infrastructure in Belgrade was bombed three times in April, twice in May, once in June and July and four times in September 1944. The heaviest casualties were recorded during the April bombing on 16 April and 17 April 1944, which coincided with the first and second days of Orthodox Easter that year. The main unit in this action was the American Fifteenth Air Force, with a base in Foggia in the south of Italy. 600 bombers took part, dropping carpet bombs from 3,000 – 5,000 metres. There was no anti-aircraft defense. Several people died on 16 April. The population of Belgrade at the time believed that the bombing was an introduction to an Allied military invasion. The bombing continued with greater intensity on 17 April, when the Sajmište concentration camp was hit where 60 detainees were killed and about 150 wounded in the camp.

Belgrade was bombed again by the Allies on 21 April, 24 April, 18 May, 6 June, 8 July, and 6 September 1944.

Bombing

Belgrade was bombed by British and American air forces on 16–17 April 1944, which was Orthodox Easter Day. The largest unit that took part was the American Fifteenth Air Force, based in Foggia in the south of Italy. This carpet bombing raid was executed by 600 aircraft flying at high altitude. Civilian casualties were as many as 1,160, while German military losses were 18, or some 1,200 killed in total. 5,000 people were wounded.

Though officially only the military and industrial targets were picked – factories, bridges, airport, ammunition depots, German barracks and garrisons - the precision of bombing was notoriously bad. Features in downtown hit on 16 April included Palace Albanija, National Theater in Belgrade, Terazije, Bajloni Market, area around the Belgrade Main railway station, Krunski Venac (including the maternity hospital where several mothers who just gave births were killed with their babies), a large number of hospitals, schools and kindergartens. Bombed areas of a wider center of Belgrade included Dorćol, which was heavily destroyed, parts of Vračar and Pašino Brdo and Dušanovac, suburbs at the time, which had no factories or military targets.

When the bombing was continued the next day, the remains of the King Alexander Bridge, partially destroyed in April 1941, were bombed. Hits were mostly concentrated on the bank areas of the city, including the Sajmište concentration camp, part of the Independent State of Croatia at the time. Some 100 prisoners were killed in the bombing. Some citizens were hiding in surviving shelters but others massively fled the city, hiding in the woods or surrounding villages. Some 1,500 tons of bombs were used in the bombing.

Other targets included Kalenić market, Central hygienic institute, Hospital for infectious diseases, Home for the blind, Labor market, Orthopedic institute, both state orphanages, for boys and girls, two homes for the children of the refugees from other parts of Yugoslavia, Children's hospital, Children's dispensary, all bridges were damaged again, railway stations in Topčider and Rakovica, Post Office No. 2, Fabrics factory of Vlada Ilić in Karaburma, Faculty of technical engineering, Vajfert's brewery, University campus. The city was crippled, yet German military objects were almost unharmed and they made only 1.5% of the fatalities.

One epitaph on the tombstone on Belgrade New Cemetery says: "They hoped to get freedom from the English, not knowing that hope leads them directly into death".

See also
 Air warfare in Yugoslavia (1941–1945)
 Operation Ratweek (1944)

References

Sources
 

1940s in Belgrade
1944 in Yugoslavia
Aerial operations and battles of World War II involving the United States
Aerial operations and battles of World War II involving the United Kingdom
Aerial operations and battles of World War II involving Germany
April 1944 events
May 1944 events
June 1944 events
July 1944 events
August 1944 events
September 1944 events
Belgrade
Military history of Belgrade
Yugoslavia in World War II